Anthony Green (born 4 April 1970) is an English actor known for playing Station Officer Mick Callaghan in series 14 of London's Burning.

Early life
Green was born in Blackburn, Lancashire, England. He began acting at the age of 6, playing The Wizard in The Wizard of Oz at Daisyfield Primary School. At St. Mary's College, Blackburn, he played Oscar Lindquist in Sweet Charity.

He continued to act while studying law at the University of Nottingham, playing John Proctor in The Crucible, Jimmy Porter in Look Back in Anger and I in a stage adaptation of Withnail and I. At the Edinburgh Fringe Festival he played Sheriff Baldwin Rawel in Richard Davidson's Storybook which won a Fringe First and was nominated for the Independent Theatre Award.

Career
In film, he played the leading role of Jonathan Berkoff, opposite Emily Lloyd, in the independent British feature The Honeytrap. He played parts in The Bourne Identity and the James Bond film Tomorrow Never Dies.He took the central role of Michael, in Amit Gupta's short film Love Story about a man's journey to find true love. It was shown at a number of film festivals across the United States and Europe and won the Verizon Audience Award at the Indo-American Arts Festival in New York.

He has played lead roles in two American TV movies: Grozny, in Sony Pictures' Anaconda 3: Offspring, which co-stars David Hasselhoff and Crystal Allen, and pirate Israel Hands in Hallmark's Blackbeard, which features Angus Macfadyen in the title role.

He played series regular lead roles in the PBS/Carlton co-production of Cadfael, playing Lord Hugh Beringar, opposite Derek Jacobi, and in the A&E/BBC co-production of The Scarlet Pimpernel, playing Sir Andrew Foulkes, opposite Richard E. Grant. He was Station Officer Mick Callaghan in the series finale of London's Burning, and DCI Be199lmarsh in Beech is Back, a special series of The Bill.

Television guest leads include If...The Oil Runs Out, Where the Heart Is (Series I and VII), Big Bad World, Wycliffe, and Wing and a Prayer. In Bonekickers he portrayed a fictional Roman character Marcus Quintanus opposite Shauna Macdonald's non-fictional Boudica. Both actors played their parts in Latin.

Filmography

Film

Television

Video games

References

External links

1970 births
English male film actors
English male television actors
Living people
People from Blackburn